Bell Post Hill is a residential suburb of Geelong, Victoria, Australia. At the 2016 census, Bell Post had a population of 4,919.

The origin of the suburb's name is thought to be from a lookout or warning bell on a post or forked tree situated on the hill overlooking Corio Bay and the Moorabool river known as Morongo estate.

Schools in Bell Post Hill
 Kardinia International College (previously Morongo College)
 Covenant College (previously Geelong Christian School)
 Rollins Primary School

Heritage listed sites

Bell Post Hill contains a number of heritage listed sites, including:

 205 Ballarat Road and 5-61 Anakie Road, Morongo
 Geelong-Ballarat railway line, Cowies Creek Rail Bridge No. 1

Sport
The suburb has an Australian Rules football team competing in the Geelong & District Football League.

Geelong Rangers FC play soccer at Myers Reserve and compete in the Victorian State League Division 2.

References

External links 
 Australian Places - Bell Post Hill
Rollins Primary School

Suburbs of Geelong